WUJA (channel 58), branded on-air as Pura Palabra Television, is a Spanish-language religious television station licensed to Caguas, Puerto Rico. Founded July 25, 1983, the station is owned by Pura Palabra Media Group, which is a subsidiary of Concilio Mision Cristiana Fuente de Agua Viva, through its licensee, Caguas Educational TV, Inc. WUJA shares transmitter facilities with Enlace-affiliated WDWL (channel 36) at Cerro La Marquesa in Aguas Buenas. The station maintains its studios located at Ave. Baldorioty de Castro in Carolina.

WUJA's programming was also seen on WQHA channel 50 in Aguada, after New Life Broadcasting sells the station in 2014.

Digital television

Digital channels

The station's digital signal is multiplexed:

Analog-to-digital conversion

On June 12, 2009, WUJA signed off its analog signal and completed its move to digital.

References

External links 
Pura Palabra Media Group

Television channels and stations established in 1983
1983 establishments in Puerto Rico
Caguas, Puerto Rico
Christian television stations in Puerto Rico